Robert William Barry (9 September 1878 – 3 December 1915) was a New Zealand cricketer and soldier who played one match of first-class cricket for Canterbury in the 1901–02 season.

Life
Barry was born in Akaroa in Canterbury and educated at Akaroa Boys' High School. He fought in one of the New Zealand contingents in the Boer War. On returning to New Zealand he moved to Auckland in 1902 and worked as a clerk for the New Zealand Express Company, a transport firm, for 13 years, resigning in order to enlist for service in the First World War.

He played one match for Canterbury, against Hawke's Bay in January 1902. His cousin, also called Bob Barry, played alongside him. Coincidentally, each cousin made 17 runs in the match and took one wicket.

He was also a prominent hockey player, who helped to establish the game in Auckland. He represented Auckland for several years and made the winning score in the Auckland hockey final in 1907.

In the First World War he served as a sapper with the Divisional Signalling Corps of the New Zealand Expeditionary Force. He was wounded and erroneously reported killed in June 1915 during the Gallipoli campaign, but he recovered and returned to the front. He was wounded again, and died of his wounds in a hospital ship off Gallipoli in December 1915.

References

External links
 
 Bob Barry at Cricket Archive

1878 births
1915 deaths
New Zealand cricketers
New Zealand male field hockey players
Canterbury cricketers
New Zealand military personnel killed in World War I
New Zealand Army soldiers
New Zealand Military Forces personnel of World War I